Daggons Road was a railway station serving the village of Alderholt, in Dorset, to the south west of Fordingbridge, in Hampshire. It was one of many casualties of the mass closure of British railway lines in the 1960s and 1970s; the last service was on 2 May 1964. It was on the Salisbury and Dorset Junction Railway, which ran north–south along the River Avon just to the West of the New Forest, connecting Salisbury to the North and Poole to the south.

Today, the road through the centre of Alderholt village is still called Station Road, changing to Daggons Road at the point where the line crossed the road. A residential cul-de-sac named Station Yard (previously Daggons Road) occupies the land where the station once stood on the north side of Daggons Road, and there is another named Churchill Close opposite to the south.

References

External links 
 www.disused-stations.org.uk Daggons Road on Subterranea Britannica
 Daggons Road station on navigable O. S. map

Disused railway stations in Dorset
Former London and South Western Railway stations
Railway stations in Great Britain opened in 1876
Railway stations in Great Britain closed in 1964
Beeching closures in England